Caroline Augusta Kennard, née Smith (15 January 1827 - 24 October 1907) was an American amateur scientist and advocate of women's rights. In correspondence with Charles Darwin she challenged his views on the inferiority of women.

Life
Caroline Augusta Smith was born on 15 January 1827 in Portsmouth, New Hampshire. She was the daughter of James Wiggin Smith and Eliza Folsom, who lived first in Exeter, New Hampshire and later in New York City. She married Martin Parry Kennard (1818-1903), a businessman in Boston, Massachusetts, in July 1846. Martin Kennard was an anti-slavery activist, who moved to Brookline, Massachusetts in 1854. He helped the black sculptor Edmonia Lewis apply for a passport in 1865.

In 1882 Caroline Kennard entered into correspondence with Darwin, arguing against women being judged intellectually inferior to men.

Kennard was listed in the 1885 Scientist's International Directory as interested in the botany of ferns and mosses. She published a biography of Dorothea Dix in the late 1880s.

On Kennard's death a science scholarship at Radcliffe College was established in her memory by her sister, Mrs Martha T. Fiske Collord.

Kennard's son Frederic Hedge Kennard (1865-1937) was an ornithologist.

Career 
After Caroline Kennard married Martin Perry Kennard in 1847, the newly wedded couple decided on a home located within the outskirts of Boston in Brookline, MA, moving here in 1854. Caroline Kennard was a prominent member of a woman's group located within Boston, which was called the New England Woman's Club. This Club was the very first woman's club that had formed at this time within the US. During the 1880s and 1890s, Kennard was not only an active member of the New England Woman's Club, serving as the Vice President in 1893 for one year, she was also a member of the board of directors.

Furthermore, Kennard was extremely passionate about women's issues and she attended various meetings for the Association of the Advancement of Women. It was at one of these meetings in 1896 where she read a paper aloud to all in attendance arguing that housework should be considered formal work similar to other professions because it is not only demanding, but contributes to the economy as well; this paper was entitled, “Housekeeping a profession”. She was particularly interested in educational reforms for women and became dedicated to promoting many issues involved in the woman's movement, including the inferior status of women within society.

In the 1880s and 1890s, Kennard's concern regarding the status and treatment of women in society persisted as she served as an officer within the Women's Educational and Industrial Union. She was actively involved in social reform her entire life as she published a variety of articles on social reform. For example, in 1895 she became a member of the Brookline Education Society, which was concerned about the development of children both at school and within the home. More specifically, Kennard prepared a paper for this organization emphasizing the need for children to study nature as she believed this positively impacted their development and education in the long run. In addition, she wrote an article entitled, “Progress in the Employment of Police Matrons”, which encouraged the police force to employ more female officers. Also, she wrote articles about important, well-known female activists and poets.

Challenging Darwin 
Nonetheless, despite her interests in women's issues and social reform within the nation, she was also intrigued by science, particularly the study of mosses and ferns. Due to her interests in both science and improving women's social status, she challenged Charles Darwin's theory regarding the biological inferiority of women. Consequently, Kennard is best known for her correspondence with Darwin himself in regards to his belief that women are biologically inferior to men, which she wholeheartedly disagreed with.

The theory that Kennard questioned was found within Darwin's On the Origin of Species, which emphasized that women are in fact inferior to men. Kennard became uneasy after she heard a woman use Darwin's Origin of Species theory regarding women's inferiority as evidence that women are scientifically inferior to their male counterparts. As a result, this incident motivated Kennard to personally write Darwin in 1881 declaring that this was inaccurate as she attested that women are not scientifically inferior to men. Kennard's goal was to receive clarification from Darwin as she did not think this theory held any truth.

In response, Darwin wrote back to Kennard referencing his work titled Descent of Man as he stated, “I certainly think that women though generally superior to men [in] moral qualities are inferior intellectually.”  In addition, Darwin noted that the only way to solve this inferiority and for the sexes to be considered equal was for women to become “breadwinners”, or to assume economic responsibility and make their own money through work. However, Darwin continued by emphasizing that if women became “breadwinners”, this would negatively harm the domestic, household sphere that he felt women belonged by resulting in the neglect of children and other household duties.  This is illustrated in his letter to Kennard claiming, “To do this, as I believe, women must become as regular ‘bread-winners’ as are men; and we may suspect that the easy education of our children, not to mention the happiness of our homes, would in this case greatly suffer.” 

Ultimately, Darwin’s response infuriated Kennard and she wrote him back on January 28, 1882,  arguing that women are certainly “breadwinners” and are not inferior to men. Nonetheless, she continued by saying that women are simply not given the same opportunities that men are, including environmental and educational opportunities. Kennard maintained that women are capable of being just as intellectual as men, yet the lack of opportunities afforded to women in society negatively impacts their level of intellect. She argued this is primarily because the scarcity of opportunities does not allow for women to foster and develop this intellect, unlike men who are given extensive opportunities especially in terms of education.

Furthermore, Kennard expressed to Darwin in their correspondence that women are crucial to society as they work equally as hard as their male counterparts, yet she claimed the major difference between the two sexes is the type of work men and women are socially accepted to carry out and thus allowed to partake in. Consequently, Kennard wrote, “Let the ‘environment’ of women be similar to that of men and with his opportunities, before she be fairly judged, intellectually his inferior, please.”  In other words, Kennard believed that if women were given the same opportunities as men, the inequalities that women face in society, like the notion that women are subordinate to men intellectually, would dissipate.

Works
 Dorothea L. Dix and her life-work, 1888
  'Progress in Employment of Police Matrons', Lend a Hand 9 (1892), pp. 180–84.

References

1827 births
1907 deaths
People from Brookline, Massachusetts
People from Portsmouth, New Hampshire
Writers from Massachusetts
19th-century American philanthropists
19th-century American women writers